Holy Ground may refer to:
 Holy ground, a location which is deemed to be sacred or hallowed.

Music

Albums 
 Holy Ground: NYC Live with the Wordless Music Orchestra, by Mono, 2010
 The Holy Ground (album), a 1993 album by Mary Black
 Holy Ground, a 2021 album by The Dead Daisies

Songs 
 "The Holy Ground", a traditional Irish song
 "Holy Ground" (2012), a song by Taylor Swift
 "Holy Ground" (Davido, Young Thug and Nicki Minaj song), 2012
 "Holy Ground", a song by a-ha from the 2005 album Analogue
 "Holy Ground", a 1994 song by Geron Davis
 "Holy Ground", a song by DJ Khaled from the 2019 album Father of Asahd

Other uses 
 The Holy Ground, a local place name in the town of Cobh, County Cork, Ireland 
 "The Holy Ground", a nickname used for Hibernian F.C.'s home venue: Hibernian Park 1880-1891, and Easter Road since 1893
 
 Battle of Holy Ground, or Battle of Econochaca, between the United States militia and the Red Stick Creek Indians during the Creek War 1813

See also